George Lewis was an 18th-century Anglican priest in Ireland.

Lewis was educated at Queens' College, Cambridge. He was Archdeacon of Meath from 1723 until his death in 1730.

References

Alumni of Queens' College, Cambridge
18th-century Irish Anglican priests
Archdeacons of Meath
1730 deaths